Kate Suzanne Richardson (née Anderson; born 5 November 1973 in Melbourne, Victoria) is an Australian athlete, who represented her native country at the 1996 Summer Olympics and 2000 Summer Olympics in the women's 5000 metres making the Semi Finals. Richardson (née Anderson) was a finalist in the 1997 World Championship 5000m (Athens, Greece), and also represented Australia in the 1999 World Championships (Seville, Spain) plus numerous World Cross-Country Championships.

In November 1999 she married fellow runner Jason A. Richardson. She is a two-time national champion in the women's 5000 metres and former Australian record holder over 1500m (breaking Jenny Orr's 20+ year record) and 5000m.

Richardson's greatest honour was claiming a gold medal at the 1998 Commonwealth Games, in the 5000m event.

Kate Richardson retired from competitive Track & Field after the 2000 Sydney Olympic Games, and is the mother of three daughters - Ruby, Milla and Cleo.

References

 
 Kate Richardson (Anderson) at Australian Athletics Historical Results

External links
 
 
 
 
 

1973 births
Living people
Australian female long-distance runners
Australian female middle-distance runners
Athletes (track and field) at the 1996 Summer Olympics
Athletes (track and field) at the 2000 Summer Olympics
Olympic athletes of Australia
Athletes (track and field) at the 1998 Commonwealth Games
Sportswomen from Victoria (Australia)
Commonwealth Games gold medallists for Australia
Athletes from Melbourne
Commonwealth Games medallists in athletics
20th-century Australian women
21st-century Australian women
Medallists at the 1998 Commonwealth Games